Conor Walsh (1979–2016) was an Irish musician, composer, and record producer based in County Mayo. He is known for combining classical and electronic music, with the Irish Independent writing, "The Mayo musician's haunting original compositions, which pop up frequently these days on TV and radio, are unwaveringly slow and melancholic."

Biography

Walsh had worked in social care before pursuing music full time and relocating to a rural cottage.
In 2013, he toured with Irish musician Hozier. In 2014, he appeared on season 12 of Other Voices.
His debut EP The Front was released in 2015 by Ensemble Music.
The Last Mixed Tape wrote of the release, "Walsh’s deft piano playing creates a harmonic body of sound that forms the majestic backbone of ‘The Front’". Walsh died of a heart attack in March 2016. His debut album, The Lucid, was released posthumously in 2019. In a four-star review, Eamon Sweeney of The Irish Times wrote that the album "hangs together as a sparkling collection of piano-based gems played in Walsh’s rich and unique style." GoldenPlec wrote, "There’s an undeniable poignancy in hearing an absent performer play music that is itself so focused on absence." Irish musician Talos sampled Conor's music on his track Dawn, The Front.

Discography

EPs

The Front, 2015

Albums

The Lucid, 2019

References

External links
 

1979 births
2016 deaths
Neoclassical composers
Musicians from County Mayo